In phonetics and phonology, a dental stop is a type of consonantal sound, made with the tongue in contact with the upper teeth (hence dental), held tightly enough to block the passage of air (hence a stop consonant).

Dental and alveolar stops are often conflated.  Acoustically, the two types of sounds are similar, and it is rare for a language to have both types.  The International Phonetic Alphabet does not provide separate symbols for dental stops, but simply uses the diacritic  attached to the corresponding alveolar symbol.  As a result, it is common for researchers working in the majority of languages with only one type or the other to simply use the alveolar symbols indifferently for both types, unless they specifically want to call attention to the distinction.

More generally, several kinds are distinguished:

 , voiceless dental plosive
 , voiced dental plosive 
 , dental ejective
 , voiced dental implosive

Notes

Dental consonants
Plosives